The Berlin-Brandenburg capital region is one of the most prolific centers of higher education and research in the world. It is the largest concentration of universities and colleges in Germany. The city has four public research universities and 27 private, professional and technical colleges (Hochschulen), offering a wide range of disciplines.  Access to the German university system is tuition free.

175,000 students were enrolled in the winter term of 2014/15. Around 20% have an international background. Student figures have grown by 50% in the last 15 years. The Humboldt Universität zu Berlin (HU Berlin) has 34,000 students, the Freie Universität Berlin (Free University of Berlin, FU Berlin) has 34,000 students, and the Technische Universität Berlin (TU Berlin) around 30,000 students. The Universität der Künste (UdK) has about 4,000 students and the Berlin School of Economics and Law has enrollment of about 10,000 students.

40 Nobel Prize winners are affiliated to the Berlin-based universities.

History

The Prussian Academy of Arts (German: Preußische Akademie der Künste) was an art school set up in Berlin, Brandenburg, in 1694/1696 by prince-elector Frederick III, in personal union Duke Frederick I of Prussia, and later king in Prussia. It had a decisive influence on art and its development in the German-speaking world throughout its existence. It dropped 'Prussian' from its name in 1945 and was finally disbanded in 1955 after the 1954 foundation of two separate academies of art for East Berlin and West Berlin in 1954. Those two separate academies merged in 1993 to form Berlin's present-day Academy of Arts.

The Humboldt University of Berlin is one of Berlin's oldest universities, founded in 1810 as the University of Berlin (Universität zu Berlin) by the liberal Prussian educational reformer and linguist Wilhelm von Humboldt, whose university model has strongly influenced other European and Western universities.

Universities

Public universities

There are six big internationally renowned research universities in the Berlin-Brandenburg capital region:
Free University of Berlin (FU Berlin), a German University of Excellence (Berlin University Alliance)
Humboldt University of Berlin (HU Berlin), a German University of Excellence (Berlin University Alliance)
The Charité is a medical school, one of the largest university hospitals in Europe and a German University of Excellence (Berlin University Alliance)
Technical University of Berlin (TU Berlin), a German University of Excellence (Berlin University Alliance)
Berlin University of the Arts (UdK)  is the largest art and design school in Europe
University of Potsdam is situated in the south western part of the Berlin urban region

Private universities

There are six recognized private universities in Berlin:
ESCP Europe Wirtschaftshochschule Berlin
Hertie School
Steinbeis-Hochschule Berlin
ESMT European School of Management and Technology 
International Psychoanalytic University Berlin

Universities of applied sciences  
Berlin has several public or private universities of applied sciences (Hochschulen für angewandte Wissenschaften)

Alice Salomon Hochschule Berlin (public)
Bard College Berlin
Berlin International University of Applied Sciences
Berlin School of Economics and Law (public)
Berufsakademie Berlin 
Berlin University of Applied Sciences and Technology (public)
CODE University of Applied Sciences 
design akademie berlin, SRH Hochschule für Kommunikation und Design 
German Academy for Film and Television Berlin
Evangelische Fachhochschule 
Hochschule für Technik und Wirtschaft Berlin (public)
Fachhochschule für Verwaltung und Rechtspflege Berlin

Hochschule für Musik Hanns Eisler (public)
Hochschule für Schauspielkunst „Ernst Busch“ (public)
International Business School
Katholische Fachhochschule 
Katholische Hochschule für Sozialwesen Berlin 
Weißensee Academy of Art Berlin (public)
Mediadesign Hochschule 
OTA private University of applied sciences Berlin (OTA Hochschule Berlin)
Teikyo University, Berlin campus
Touro College Berlin

Research institutions

Berlin has a high density of research institutions, such as the Fraunhofer Society, the Leibniz Association, the Helmholtz Association, and the Max Planck Society, which are independent of, or only loosely connected to its universities. A total number of around 65,000 scientists are working in research and development in 2012. The city is one of the centers of knowledge and innovation communities (Future Information and Communication Society and Climate Change Mitigation and Adaptation) of the European Institute of Innovation and Technology (EIT).

Berlin-Brandenburgische Akademie der Wissenschaften
Biologische Bundesanstalt für Land- und Forstwirtschaft
Bundesanstalt für Materialforschung und -prüfung (BAM)
Bundesinstitut für Risikobewertung
Telekom Innovation Laboratories (affiliated with TU Berlin)
German Archaeological Institute (DAI)
Deutsches Bibliotheksinstitut
Deutsches Herzzentrum Berlin
Deutsches Institut für Urbanistik
Ecologic gGmbH 
Fachinformationszentrum Chemie 
Institute for Cultural Inquiry
Institute of Electronic Business 
Zuse Institute Berlin (ZIB)
Otto Suhr Institute for Political Science (OSI) of the Freie Universität Berlin
Physikalisch-Technische Bundesanstalt (PTB)
Robert Koch Institute (RKI)
Socio-Economic Panel (SOEP)
Umweltbundesamt 
Wissenschaftskolleg zu Berlin - Institute for Advanced Study, Berlin 
Wissenschaftszentrum Berlin für Sozialforschung 
Wissenschafts- und Wirtschaftsstandort Adlershof
Institut für Museumskunde
Institut für Ökologische Wirtschaftsforschung gGmbH 
Institute for Media and Communication Policy

Leibniz Institutes

Leibniz Sozietät
Deutsches Institut für Internationale Pädagogische Forschung (DIPF)
German Institute for Economic Research - Deutsches Institut für Wirtschaftsforschung (DIW)
Deutsches Rheumaforschungszentrum Berlin (DRFZ)
Leibniz-Institut für Sozialwissenschaften (GESIS)
Leibniz-Institut für Analytische Wissenschaften – ISAS – e.V.
Natural History Museum, Berlin (MfN)
WZB Berlin Social Science Center

Under Forschungsverbund Berlin e. V. (FVB) (Research Association of Berlin):
Ferdinand-Braun-Institut für Höchstfrequenztechnik 
Leibniz-Institut für Molekulare Pharmakologie (FMP) 
Leibniz-Institut für Gewässerökologie und Binnenfischerei (IGB) 
Leibniz-Institut für Kristallzüchtung 
Institut für Zoo- und Wildtierforschung 
Max-Born-Institut für Nichtlineare Optik und Kurzzeitspektroskopie (MBI) 
Paul-Drude-Institut für Festkörperelektronik, Leibniz-Institut (PDI)  
Weierstraß-Institut für Angewandte Analysis und Stochastik (WIAS)

Helmholtz centers

Max Delbrück Center for Molecular Medicine
Helmholtz-Zentrum Berlin (BESSY)
Institut für Planetenforschung of the Deutsches Zentrum für Luft- und Raumfahrt

Max-Planck Institutes

Fritz Haber Institute of the MPG (FHI)
Max Planck Institute for Human Development
Max Planck Institute for Infection Biology
Max Planck Institute for Molecular Genetics (MOLGEN)
Max Planck Institute for the History of Science
 Archiv zur Geschichte der Max-Planck-Gesellschaft

Fraunhofer Institutes

Fraunhofer-Institut für Nachrichtentechnik
Heinrich-Hertz-Institut (HHI)  
Sino-German Mobile Communications Institute 
Fraunhofer-Institut für offene Kommunikationssysteme (FOKUS) 
Fraunhofer-Institut für Produktionsanlagen und Konstruktionstechnik (IPK) 
Fraunhofer-Institut für Rechnerarchitektur und Softwaretechnik (integrated into FOKUS in 2012) 
Fraunhofer-Institut für Software- und Systemtechnik (integrated into FOKUS in 2012) 
Fraunhofer-Institut für Zuverlässigkeit und Mikrointegration (IZM)

Nobel Prize winners 

There are 43 Nobel laureates affiliated to the Berlin-based Universities:

See also
 Science and technology in Germany
 Education in Germany
 List of universities in Germany

References

 List of universities, colleges, and research institutions in Berlin
List of universities, colleges, and research institutions
Universities, colleges, and research institutions
Berlin, List of universities, colleges, and research institutions in